Tang-e Zirgol Bardar (also Romanized as Tang-e Zīrgol Bardar; also known as Tang-e Zīrgol Darbar) is a village in Susan-e Gharbi Rural District, Susan District, Izeh County, Khuzestan Province, Iran. At the 2006 census, its population was 114, in 23 families.

References 

Populated places in Izeh County